Masque is an Indian restaurant located in Mumbai, Maharashtra. It was founded by Prateek Sadhu and Aditi Dugar in 2016.

Masque is best known for its 10-course tasting menu and is often counted among Asia's and India's best restaurants. In 2022, it was ranked #21 in the list of Asia's 50 Best Restaurants.

See also 

 Indian Accent
 List of Indian restaurants

References 

2016 establishments in India
Indian restaurants
Restaurants established in 2016
Restaurants in Mumbai